Frederik "Fred" Erdman (13 August 1933 – 10 April 2021) was a Belgian lawyer and politician. He was a member of the senate (1991–1999) and chamber of representatives (1999–2003), Party chair for SP (1998–1999).

References

1933 births
2021 deaths
Belgian jurists
Politicians from Antwerp
Members of the Senate (Belgium)
Members of the Chamber of Representatives (Belgium)
Free University of Brussels (1834–1969) alumni